This is a list of electoral results for the electoral district of Chermside in Queensland state elections.

Members for Chermside

Election results

Elections in the 1990s
The results for the 1998 election were:

Elections in the 1950s

References

Queensland state electoral results by district